William Elson (1673–1705), of Oving, near Chichester, Sussex, was an English politician.

He was a Member (MP) of the Parliament of England for Chichester in 1695–1698
and February 1701 – October 1705.

References

1673 births
1705 deaths
English MPs 1695–1698
People from Chichester
English MPs 1701–1702
English MPs 1702–1705